Araneus cingulatus is a species of orb weaver in the family of spiders known as Araneidae. It is found in the United States.

References

External links

 

Araneus
Articles created by Qbugbot
Spiders described in 1841